Ebrahimabad, Zahedan is a village in Cheshmeh Ziarat Rural District, in the Central District of Zahedan County, Sistan and Baluchestan Province, Iran. At the 2006 census, its population was 31, in 5 families.

References 

Populated places in Zahedan County